The “Prize of the Böttcherstraße in Bremen” (Kunstpreis der Böttcherstraße in Bremen) is a German award in the field of contemporary art that was first presented in 1954, making it one of the oldest awards of its kind. According to the Prize's rules, the award is “intended to honour visual artists living in the German speaking area who have not yet received a public distinction of a kind corresponding to the quality of their work”. From 1985 to 1991, the award was called "Bremer Kunstpreis".

Background

Every two years, ten international curators each nominate an artist who is then invited to participate in an exhibition, hosted by the Kunsthalle Bremen. A catalogue accompanies the exhibition. During the course of the show, an international five-member jury selects the winner of the award.

The prize money of 30.000 Euro is provided by the Donors’ Circle (Stifterkreis für den Kunstpreis der Böttcherstraße in Bremen), an independent organization within the Bremen Art Association (Kunstverein in Bremen). The Prize of the Böttcherstraße in Bremen therefore ranks amongst the most highly endowed awards for contemporary art in Germany.

The Donors’ Circle also supports the acquisition of a work by the winner of the prize for the collection of the Kunsthalle Bremen. Works by awardees Martin Honert, Ólafur Elíasson, Wolfgang Tillmans, Tino Sehgal, Ulla von Brandenburg and Tea Jorjadze, among others, have thus entered the museum's collection.

History and awardees

During the course of its existence, the Prize of the Böttcherstraße in Bremen changed its name twice. Originally founded as "Kunstpreis der Böttcherstraße", it was renamed "Bremer Kunstpreis" in 1985. Since 1993 the award is known as "Kunstpreis der Böttcherstraße in Bremen".

"Kunstpreis der Böttcherstraße in Bremen" (1993-present)

 2018 Arne Schmitt 
 2016 Emeka Ogboh
 2014 Nina Beier
 2012 Daniel Knorr
 2009 Tea Jorjadze
 2007 Ulla von Brandenburg
 2005 Clemens von Wedemeyer
 2003 Tino Sehgal
 2001 Heike Aumüller
 1999 Olaf Nicolai
 1997 Ólafur Elíasson
 1995 Wolfgang Tillmans
 1993 Martin Honert

"Bremer Kunstpreis" (1985-1991)

 1991 Thomas Lehnerer
 1989 Stephan Balkenhol
 1987 Eberhard Boßlet
 1985 Martin Disler

"Kunstpreis der Böttcherstraße" (1955-1983)

 1983 Antonius Höckelmann, Cologne
 1982 Mechthild Nemeczek, Cologne
 1981 Alf Schuler, Cologne
 1980 Martin Rosz, Berlin, Walter Stöhrer, Berlin
 1979 Rebecca Horn, Hamburg
 1978 Dorothee von Windheim, Hamburg
 1977 Wolfgang Nestler, Aachen
 1976 László Lakner, Berlin
 1975 Jürgen Brodwolf, Vogelbach, Günther Knipp, Munich
 1974 Ursula Sax, Berlin, Max Kaminski, Berlin
 1973 Hermann Waldenburg, Berlin
 1972 Klaus Fußmann, Berlin
 1971 Uli Pohl, Bremen
 1970 Hansjerg Maier-Aichen, Leinfelden
 1969 Dieter Krieg, Baden-Baden, Michael Schoenholtz
 1968 Hans Baschang, Karlsruhe
 1967 Gerlinde Beck, Großglattbach, Helga Föhl, Wiesbaden
 1966 Jens Lausen, Hamburg
 1965 Karl Goris, Hamburg
 1964 Ekkehard Thieme, Flensburg
 1963 Sigrid Kopfermann, Düsseldorf
 1962 Ruth Robbel, Berlin
 1961 Günter Ferdinand Ris, Oberpleis/Siebengebirge
 1960 Erhart Mitzlaff, Fischerhude
 1959 Rudolf Kügler, Berlin
 1958 Horst Skodlerrak, Lübeck
 1957 Fritz Koenig, Ganslberg/Landshut
 1956 Ernst Weiers, Bernried/Starnberg
 1955 Hans Meyboden, Freiburg im Breisgau

References

External links

Official video clips 
Image film "Der Kunstpreis der Böttcherstraße in Bremen", 2015 (in German)
Exhibition film "Kunstpreis der Böttcherstrasse 2014", 2014 (in German)

Further reading

Exhibition reviews 
 Anne Stürzer: Fremde Wesen im Museum, Nordseezeitung Bremerhaven, July 28, 2018 (review of the 2018 exhibition, in German)
 Alexandra Knief: Flucht vor der Wirklichkeit. Die Kunsthalle zeigt Ausstellung der Nominierten für den diesjährigen Kunstpreis der Böttcherstraße, Weserkurier, July 28, 2018 (review of the 2018 exhibition, in German)
 Florian Maier: Ein Mittelmeer für Afrika. Utopien und Science-Fiction-Szenarios ziehen sich wie ein roter Faden durch die Arbeiten für den Kunstpreis der Böttcherstraße, die in der Kunsthalle zu besichtigen sind, taz Bremen Nord, Aug. 4/5, 2018, p. 47 (review of the 2018 exhibition, in German)
 Anette Schneider: Das Mittelmeer austrocknen: Ausstellung in der Kunsthalle Bremen (podcast), Deutschlandfunk Kultur, July 27, 2018 (review of the 2018 exhibition, in German)
 Rolf Stein: Kunsthalle Bremen zeigt Anwärter auf Kunstpreis der Böttcherstraße, Kreiszeitung, July 28, 2018 (review of the 2018 exhibition, in German)
 Nicole Büsing & Heiko Klaas: Türspione und Babywippen. In Bremen ist beim Kunstpreis der Böttcherstraße für Nachwuchskünstler alles möglich, Monopol, May 25, 2016 (review of the 2016 exhibition, in German)
 Peter Groth: Kunstpreis der Böttcherstraße: Ausstellung startet, Weserkurier, April 22, 2016 (review of the 2016 exhibition, in German)
 Rainer B. Schossig: Schöne, schreckliche Geschichten, Weserkurier, Sep. 15, 2012 (review of the 2012 exhibition)

General information 
Exhibitions and artists of the Bremen Art Prize and the Art Prize of the Böttcherstrasse in Bremen, 1985-2012

Early career awards
German awards
Culture in Bremen (city)
Arts awards in Germany
Contemporary art awards
Awards established in 1954
German contemporary art
Austrian contemporary art
1954 establishments in Germany